Return of the Prodigal Son is a parable of Jesus from the Bible.

Return of the Prodigal Son may also refer to:

The Return of the Prodigal Son (Guercino), a series of four paintings
The Return of the Prodigal Son (Rembrandt), a painting
The Return of the Prodigal Son, a painting by Pompeo Batoni 
The Return of the Prodigal Son (album) by Stanley Turrentine, 1967
The Return of the Prodigal Son, a 2013 album by Axe Murder Boyz/Young Wicked
The Return of the Prodigal Son (1966 film), a Czech drama film
The Return of the Prodigal Son (1976 film), an Egyptian drama film
Le retour de l'enfant prodigue (The Return of the Prodigal Son), a 1907 short story by André Gide

See also
 The Prodigal Son (disambiguation)
Return of the Prodigal Sunn, a 2005 album by Sunz of Man
Return of the Prodigal (Cui Jian album), 1984